The Monte Catria is a mountain in the central Apennines, in the province of Pesaro e Urbino, Marche, central Italy.

It is a massif of limestone rocks dating to some 200 million years ago.

Historically, it marked the boundary between the Exarchate of Ravenna and the Duchy of Spoleto

The source of the Cesano river is located nearby.

Mountains of Marche
Mountains of the Apennines